Richard Golle (born 28 May 1895, date of death unknown) was a German racing cyclist. He won the German National Road Race in 1919 and 1923.

References

External links

1895 births
Year of death missing
German male cyclists
Cyclists from Berlin
German cycling road race champions
20th-century German people